Bryan W. Nolen was an Oklahoma City, Oklahoma architect who served as a Major in the Oklahoma National Guard.  He designed numerous armories built under the Works Progress Administration.  He is credited with more than 20 buildings that are preserved and listed on the National Register of Historic Places.

His works include:
Anadarko Armory, 700 W. Oklahoma St., Anadarko, OK (Nolen, Bryan W.) NRHP-listed
Clinton Armory, 723 S. Thirteenth St., Clinton, OK (Nolen, Bryan W.) NRHP-listed
Cushing Armory, 218 S. Little Ave., Cushing, OK (Nolen, Bryan W.) NRHP-listed
Eufaula Armory, 48 Memorial Dr., Eufaula, OK (Nolen, Bryan W.) NRHP-listed
Guthrie Armory, 720 E. Logan, Guthrie, OK (Nolen, Bryan W.) NRHP-listed
Healdton Armory, Jct. of Fourth and Franklin Sts., Healdton, OK (Nolen, Bryan W.) NRHP-listed
Hominy Armory, 201 N. Regan St., Hominy, OK (Nolen, Bryan W.) NRHP-listed
Kingfisher Armory, 301 N. 6th St., Kingfisher, OK (Nolen, Bryan W.) NRHP-listed
Konawa Armory, 625 N. State St., Konawa, OK (Nolen, Bryan W.) NRHP-listed
Mangum Armory, 115 E. Lincoln St., Mangum, OK (Nolen, Bryan W.) NRHP-listed
Marlow Armory, 702 W. Main St., Marlow, OK (Nolen, Bryan W.) NRHP-listed
Minco Armory, 407 W. Pontotoc St., Minco, OK (Nolen, Bryan W.) NRHP-listed
Okemah Armory, 405 N. 6th St., Okemah, OK (Nolen, Bryan W.) NRHP-listed
Okmulgee Armory, Jct. of 2nd. and Alabama Sts., Okmulgee, OK (Nolen, Bryan W.) NRHP-listed
Pawhuska Armory, 823 E. 8th St., Pawhuska, OK (Nolen, Bryan W.) NRHP-listed
Pawnee Armory, Jct. of First and Cleveland Sts., Pawnee, OK) NRHP-listed
Roff Armory, Jct. of Burns and N. 9th Sts., Roff, OK (Nolen, Bryan W.) NRHP-listed
Sulphur Armory, 500 W. Wynnewood Ave., Sulphur, OK (Nolen, Bryan W.) NRHP-listed
Tahlequah Armory, 100 Water Ave., Tahlequah, OK (Nolen, Bryan W.) NRHP-listed
Tishomingo Armory, 500 E. 24th St., Tishomingo, OK (Nolen, Bryan W.) NRHP-listed
Tonkawa Armory, Third and North Sts., Tonkawa, OK (Nolen, Bryan) NRHP-listed
Wagoner Armory, 509 E. Cherokee St., Wagoner, OK (Nolen, Bryan W.) NRHP-listed
Watonga Armory, 301 W. Main, Watonga, OK (Nolen, Bryan W.) NRHP-listed
Weatherford Armory, 123 W. Rainey St., Weatherford, OK (Nolen, Bryan W.) NRHP-listed

References

Architects from Oklahoma City
Lists of buildings and structures in Oklahoma